Tiefenort is a village and a former municipality in the Wartburgkreis district of Thuringia, Germany. Since July 2018, it is part of the town Bad Salzungen. It is situated on the river Werra, 5 km west of Bad Salzungen, and 8 km east of Vacha, Germany.

History
An 1137 document of the Hersfeld Abbey already contains a reference to Tiefenort (Diffeshart).
The establishment of the township was closely related to the
castle Krayenburg, which dates back to 786 (at least).

Within the German Empire (1871-1918), Tiefenort was part of the Grand Duchy of Saxe-Weimar-Eisenach.

Notable people
 Edgar Most (1940−2015)*, last Vice President of the State's bank of GDR and advisor of the German government for the "Aufbau Ost" programme after 1990

References

External links
Township Website (in German)
Spring Cultural Festival

Former municipalities in Thuringia
Wartburgkreis